Peter Wilson is a British record producer. Amongst several others, Wilson worked with the Style Council, Sham 69 and the Comsat Angels.

Career
Wilson is a graduate of Surrey University where he studied on the Tonmeister music course. While on the Tonmeister course he enjoyed a placement with AIR Studios. In that time he worked with, among others, producers George Martin, Tony Visconti and Chris Thomas, engineers Geoff Emerick and Bill Price and musician Dave Gilmour (Pink Floyd).
After leaving Surrey University, he worked as an engineer at Polydor Studios, working with artists including Brian Eno, Neil Sedaka, Bill Bruford, Alexis Korner and Peggy Lee. After five years with Polydor, Wilson went freelance.

Polydor years
The first work that established his career was his production of "Angels with Dirty Faces" by Sham 69. He went on to produce singles including "Hurry Up Harry" and "If the Kids Are United" and four albums by Sham 69, and it was during this period that he also produced for the Passions ("I'm in Love with a German Film Star") and four albums with the Comsat Angels, including their single "Independence Day".

It was at Polydor that Wilson first worked with Paul Weller (then still with the Jam) on some demos which in turn led to Wilson producing the last Jam studio album, The Gift, and several singles including "Town Called Malice". He continued to work with Paul Weller with the Style Council, co-producing three studio albums and hits such as "Speak Like a Child", "Long Hot Summer", and "My Ever Changing Moods".

Other records he produced include the Blow Monkeys' single "Digging Your Scene" and albums Limping for a Generation and Animal Magic.

Partial discography

Albums
 The Style Council - Introducing The Style Council
 The Style Council - Café Bleu
 The Style Council - Our Favourite Shop
 Sham 69 - Tell Us the Truth
 Sham 69 - That's Life
 Sham 69 - The Adventures of the Hersham Boys
 Sham 69 - The Game
 Fiction Factory - Throw the Warped Wheel Out
 Patrik Fitzgerald - Grubby Stories
 The Comsat Angels - Waiting for a Miracle
 The Comsat Angels - Sleep No More
 The Comsat Angels - Fiction
 The Jam - The Gift
 The Jam - Dig the New Breed
 The Cockney Rejects - Greatest Hits Vol. 1
 The Blow Monkeys -  Limping for a Generation
 The Blow Monkeys - Animal Magic

Singles
 The Passions - "I'm in Love with a German Film Star"
 Fiction Factory - "(Feels Like) Heaven"
 Fiction Factory - "Ghost of Love"
 The Jam - "Funeral Pyre"
 The Jam - "Absolute Beginners"
 The Jam - "Town Called Malice"
 The Jam - "Beat Surrender"

References

 

Year of birth missing (living people)
Place of birth missing (living people)
English record producers
English audio engineers
Living people
Alumni of the University of Surrey